3/OFF is an Armenian television program hosted by Armenian presenter-producer Artyom Hakobyan. The first season of the series premiered on Armenia TV on April 7, 2017. The second one premiered on October 6, 2017. It currently airs on Fridays at 21:00.

The show is an intellectual game show where two teams (of three contestants each) compete.

External links

 

Armenian-language television shows
Armenia TV original programming
Armenian television game shows
2010s Armenian television series
2010s game shows